Anvarza Castle is an ancient castle in Adana Province, Turkey.

Geography
The castle was built on the hill. The hill is accessible via a path from the south.

History

The castle had been built to control the ancient city with the same name. The remains of the city (which is on the plains) lies between the village and the castle. During the history the castle had switched hands and partially ruined several times (Roman Empire, Byzantine Empire, Abbasid Caliphate, Crusaders, Armenian Kingdom of Cilicia, Mamluks of Egypt etc.). Archaeological evidence indicates that the majority of the fortress is of Armenian construction, including the small basilica of T’oros I (AD 1111) and the chapels. The donjon was built by the Crusaders in the 12th century. Although the city was evacuated in 1274 following an earthquake the castle was used by Mamluks.

Building

There are 20 bastions. The east to west dimensions are much less than the length. The north bailey has not been surveyed. The military quarters are confined to the south and central baileys, which are separated by the Crusader donjon. The castle can be visited free of charge.

See also
Other castles in the region include:
 Servantikar
 Lampron
 Yılankale

References

External links
For photos
Extensive photographic survey and plan of Anavarza Castle

Buildings and structures in Adana Province
Kozan, Adana
Castles in Turkey
Tourist attractions in Adana Province